Buchères is a commune in the Aube department in north-central France.

World War II
On August 24, 1944, men of the 51st SS-Brigade massacred 68 people, of whom ten were children under ten year old, five were elderly above seventy years, including 35 women and three babies of 18, 11 and 6 months.

Population

See also
 Communes of the Aube department

Bibliography
 Crimes allemands : Le Martyre de Buchères (Aube) : 24 août 1944, Troyes : Grande impr. de Troyes, 1945, 48 p., ill.

References

Communes of Aube
Aube communes articles needing translation from French Wikipedia
War crimes in France